The Publicity in Taking Evidence Act was an act passed in 1913 that provided that depositions of witnesses for use in any anti-trust suit "shall be open to the public as freely as are trials in open court."

1913 in American law
62nd United States Congress
United States federal antitrust legislation

United States federal legislation articles without infoboxes